(von) Strucker may refer to:

Baron Strucker, real name Wolfgang von Strucker, fictional character created for Marvel Comics by Stan Lee and Jack Kirby
Elisbeth von Strucker, comic book character and wife of Baron Strucker in Marvel Comics' main shared universe
Andreas von Strucker, comic book character and twin brother of Andrea in Marvel Comics' main shared universe
Andrea von Strucker, comic book character and twin sister of Andreas in Marvel Comics' main shared universe
Werner von Strucker, fictional character in the Marvel Comics universe
Wolfgang von Strucker, also known as Baron Zero, an Amalgam Comics character